Elizabeth Baker (1876–1962) was an English playwright.

Elizabeth Baker may also refer to:

Elizabeth Anstice Baker (1849–1914), Australian intellectual and social activist, see John Baker
E. D. Baker, American children's novelist
Betsy Baker (born 1955), American actress
Betsy Baker (supercentenarian) (1842–1955), first listed supercentenarian in the Guinness Book of Records
Elizabeth Baker (actress), actress in the film The Vision
Elizabeth Baker (diarist) ( 1720 – c. 1797), English secretary, diarist, and amateur geologist
Elizabeth Baker (economist) (1885–1973), American economist and academic
Elizabeth Baker (runner) from America's Finest City Half Marathon
Elizabeth Gowdy Baker (1860–1927), American portrait painter
Elizabeth Baker (Kansas politician) (1941–2021)

See also
Anne Elizabeth Baker (1786–1861),  English philologist, historian and illustrator